Cornelius Fredericks (also: Frederiks) (died 16 February 1907) was a leader of the ǃAman (Bethanie Orlam), a subtribe of the Orlam people, in the southern area of German South-West Africa, today's Namibia. He was a rival Kaptein of the Bethanie Orlam, contesting the chieftaincy of Paul Fredericks. Among the Orlam people living in Bethanie, Cornelius had more followers but Paul was the official leader who also had the support of the German colonial powers.

When the Herero and Namaqua War of 1904–1907 broke out, Fredericks was one of the indigenous leaders that actively fought a guerrilla-style war against the Germans. He often sided with Hendrik Witbooi, leader of the ǀKhowesin (Witbooi Orlam), and both were wanted for a 3,000 marks (ℳ) ransom. The German Schutztruppe kept the upper hand in the majority of battles and forced most Nama and Orlam groups to surrender. The group under Fredericks gave up on 3 March 1906.

On 9 September 1906 Cornelius Fredericks was imprisoned at Shark Island concentration camp in Lüderitz as part of a group of 1,795 Nama people, some of whom were decapitated and whose heads were sent to Germany for racial anthropological research. Most of them died in the icy wind due to malnutrition and neglect, their bodies were buried at low tide and soon washed into the ocean. Fredericks died on 16 February 1907. A memorial in his remembrance now stands on Shark Island.

References

External links
  Picture of Cornelius Fredericks at Shark Island

Nama people
People from Hardap Region
19th-century births
1907 deaths